Church attendance is a central religious practice for many Christians; some Christian denominations, such as the Catholic Church require church attendance on the Lord's Day (Sunday); the Westminster Confession of Faith is held by the Reformed Churches and teaches first-day Sabbatarianism (Sunday Sabbatarianism), thus proclaiming the duty of public worship in keeping with the Ten Commandments. Similarly, The General Rules of the Methodist Church also requires "attending upon all the ordinances of God" including "the public worship of God". The Lutheran Christian theologian  stated that church attendance is the "foundation for the Christian life" as "the Christian Bible and the sacraments provide the framework for the faith"; he also states that it is important for believers because it aids in the prevention of backsliding, as well as offers "the company of other believers". Until 1791, the government of the United Kingdom required attendance at church services of the Church of England (the mother Church of the Anglican Communion and a state Church) at least twice a year.

About two-thirds of Latin American Christians and 90% of African Christians (in Ghana, Nigeria, Rwanda and Zimbabwe), according to the World Values Survey, said they attended church regularly. South Africa is the only African country where just 55% of people attend church regularly. Data from the European Social Survey in 2012 showed that around a third of European Christians said they attend services once a month or more. The Gallup International, a self-reporting survey conducted via telephone, indicates that 37% of Americans report that they attend religious services weekly or near-weekly in 2013. The Pew Research Center stated, however, that there is a "sharp increase in church attendance around the two most significant Christian holidays, Christmas and Easter." As such, on Christmas (a holy day of obligation in the Catholic Church, a Festival in the Lutheran Churches and a Principal Feast in the Anglican Communion), LifeWay Research found that "six out of 10 Americans typically attend church". Countries that hold or have held a policy of state atheism have actively discouraged church attendance and church membership, often persecuting Christians who continued to worship.

Theology 

The holding of church services pertains to the observance of the Lord's Day in Christianity. The Bible has a precedent for a pattern of morning and evening worship that has given rise to Sunday morning and Sunday evening services of worship held in the churches of many Christian denominations today, a "structure to help families sanctify the Lord’s Day." In Psalm 92, which is a prayer concerning the observance of the Sabbath, the prophet David writes "It is good to give thanks to the Lord, to sing praises to your name, O Most High; to declare your steadfast love in the morning, and your faithfulness by night" (cf.  ). Church father Eusebius of Caesarea thus declared: "For it is surely no small sign of God’s power that throughout the whole world in the churches of God at the morning rising of the sun and at the evening hours, hymns, praises, and truly divine delights are offered to God. God’s delights are indeed the hymns sent up everywhere on earth in his Church at the times of morning and evening." The early Christians attended two liturgies on the Lord's Day, worshipping communally in both a morning service and evening service, with the purpose of reading the Scriptures and celebrating the Eucharist. Throughout the rest of the week, Christians assembled at the church every day for morning prayer (which became known as lauds) and evening prayer (which became known as vespers), while praying at the other fixed prayer times privately; Christian monastics came to gather together to corporately pray all of the seven canonical hours communally.

Among Sunday Sabbatarians (First-day Sabbatarians), observance of the Lord's Day often takes the form of attending the Sunday morning service of worship, receiving catechesis through Sunday School, performing acts of mercy (such as evangelism, visiting prisoners in jails and seeing the sick at hospitals), and attending the Sunday evening service of worship, as well as refraining from Sunday shopping, servile work, playing sports, viewing the television, and dining at restaurants.

The majority of Christian denominations hold church services on the Lord's Day (with many offering Sunday morning and Sunday evening services); a number of traditions have mid-week Wednesday evening services as well. In some Christian denominations, church services are held daily, with these including those in which the canonical hours are prayed, as well as the offering of the Mass, among other forms of worship. In addition to this, many Christians attend services of worship on holy days such as Christmas, Ash Wednesday, Good Friday, Ascension Thursday, among others depending on the Christian denomination.

Statistics 

The Gallup International, a self-reporting survey conducted via telephone, indicates that 37% of Americans report that they attend religious services weekly or near-weekly in 2013. Self-reporting surveys conducted online indicate substantially lower weekly attendance rates, and methods of measurement that do not rely on self-reporting estimate even lower rates; for instance, a 2005 study published in the Journal for the Scientific Study of Religion found that just 22% of Americans attend services weekly. This compares to other countries' claims such as 15% of French citizens, 10% of British citizens, 8.8% of Australian citizens and 5.6% of Dutch citizens. In the U.K., in 2011, an average once-a-week attendance in Anglican churches went down by 0.3% compared with 2012, thus exhibiting a stabilizing trend. Previously, starting from 2000, an average rate of weekly church attendance in Britain was dropping down 1% annually. In 2013, the Pew Research Center reported that 37% of all Americans attended church on a weekly basis. In its turn, Gallup estimated the once-a-week church attendance of the Americans in 2013 as 39%.

Based on 1990–1991 data, it was estimated that the country with the highest rate of church attendance in the world was Nigeria (89%) and with the lowest – the Soviet Union (2%). Nigeria's data was notable, as Nigeria is very religiously diverse – the population is 50.1% Muslim and 48.2% Christian. The state authorities in the USSR, which dissolved in 1991, discouraged church construction; they had a hostile relationship with traditional organized religions and instead promoted Marxist-Leninist ideology, which espoused state atheism.
A survey commissioned by the Época Magazine in 2005 showed that 29% of Brazilians attend church weekly, and indicated that it is lesser than in the United States but higher than in Western Europe and Japan, indeed showing that contrary to the local popular belief, Brazilians of the time could indeed be regarded as a religious people even in practice (though it is ponderable that the growth of the population declaring to be solely irreligious in nationwide censuses grew about 100% between 2000 and 2010, and 200% between 2000 and 2013, from 4% to 12%, and general secularization also grew among the portion of the population that remained religious).

A 2006 Financial Times (FT)/Harris Poll conducted online surveyed 12,507 adults over 16 years old in the United States (2,010 U.S. adults were surveyed) and five European countries (France, Italy, Germany, Great Britain and Spain). The survey found that only 26% of those polled attended religious services "every week or more often", 9% went "once or twice a month", 21% went "a few times a year", 3% went "once a year", 22% went "less than once a year", and 18% never attend religious services. Harris Interactive stated that the magnitude of errors cannot be estimated due to sampling errors and non-response bias. A previous nearly identical survey by Harris in 2003 found that only 26% of those surveyed attended religious services "every week or more often", 11% went "once or twice a month" 19% went "a few times a year", 4% went "once a year", 16% went "less than once a year", and 25% never attend religious services.

Calculating the church's average weekend attendance is important since it determines the size of a given church. For example, in the U.S., an average weekend attendance of more than 2,000 people separates a mega church from a large church, and an average weekend attendance between 51 and 300 people defines the large church; while a small church is the church with an attendance lower than 50 people. (Alternative definitions, such as house church, simple church, intentional community, were proposed by the Barna Group, an American private consulting firm.) A narrow definition of a regular church attendee can be viewed as a synonym for a Sunday service visitation, while a broad definition, names as a regular attendee a person who comes to church during three out of eight weekends.

Attendance by country
The frequency at which Christians attend church services varies greatly around the world. In some countries weekly attendance at religious services is common among Christians, while in others weekly attendance is rare. The following attendance statistics are mostly based on self-reporting surveys and may not accurately reflect real attendance figures.

The following church attendance statistics are taken from the 2004 Gallup report, based on self-reporting telephone surveys. However, it is unclear whether the survey was solely of Christians in the respective country or the entire population (including non-Christians).

A study by the European Social Survey conducted in 2008 found these rates of respondents never attending religious service (excluding special occasions):

Attendance by U.S. state
The frequency by which adults attend church services also vary on a state-by-state basis in the United States.

Demographics 

The Pew Research Center studied the effects of gender on religiosity throughout the world, finding that women are generally more religious than men, yet the gender gap is greater for Christians than Muslims. Pew Research Center data in 53 countries, found that 53% of Christian women and 46% of Christian men say they attend services at least once a week. While Christians of both genders in African countries are equally likely to regularly attend services.

Church attendance remains stronger among older demographics, and more common for women in the West. There is evidence that links church attendance with health benefits. The Pew Research Center, which conducts the extensive research and information program Pew Forum on Religion and Public Life, has linked regular church attendance with happiness. Several studies associated church attendance with decreased risk of Alzheimer's disease. Research by Rita W. Law and David A. Sbarra demonstrated that "church attendance was found to have a protective effect against the emergence of mood problems among older adults." Graham et al. discovered that "consistent pattern of lower systolic and diastolic blood pressures among frequent church attenders was found compared to that of infrequent attenders which was not due to the effects of age, obesity, cigarette smoking, or socioeconomic status." Oman D et al. found that "infrequent (never or less than weekly) attenders had significantly higher rates of circulatory, cancer, digestive, and respiratory mortality (p < 0.05), but not mortality due to external causes." With respect to students, Glanville et al. found "that religious attendance promotes higher intergenerational closure, friendship networks with higher educational resources and norms, and extracurricular participation." Research conducted at the Harvard School of Public Health found "that regularly attending church services together reduces a couple’s risk of divorce by 47 percent".

A 2018 sociological survey found that in the United States, "Donald Trump voters who attend church regularly are more likely than nonreligious Trump voters to have warmer feelings toward racial and religious minorities, to be more supportive of immigration and trade, and to be more concerned about poverty." A 2005 European Union survey found that religious belief increased with age and was higher among women, those who were leaning towards right-wing politics, and those reflecting more upon philosophical and ethical issues. In particular, the Iona Institute documented increasing church attendance in Ireland, despite sex-abuse scandals that plagued the Catholic Church. Some suggest the rise is due to the effects of the economic recession.

Research shows that there is a correlation between church attendance and the level of education. For instance, in a Pew Research study from 1996, approximately 34% of high school dropouts went to church on a typical Sunday, while 44% of those with a college degree or higher did. 48% of married individuals attended church on a typical Sunday, compared with 29% of divorced and 31% of never-married individuals. While it is likely that the well-educated and married might over-report their church attendance more often, these findings nevertheless demonstrate that they have maintained a stronger church-going identity than other Americans. In the United Kingdom, research in 2018 demonstrated that "Students at Oxford, Cambridge and Durham are twice as likely to worship on a Sunday as the general population"—colleges at these universities maintain approximately fifty-six chapels for worship.

According to a 2017 study by the Pew Research Center, overall, American Christians are more likely to have college degrees than the general population. The study found that highly educated Christians in the United States are more likely to attend church than those with lower education levels. On a scale measuring levels of religious commitment, over 70% of Christians in the United States who are educated demonstrate high levels of religiosity.

Influence of parents 
Several research studies in the USA and Europe found that church attendance practices of parents, especially fathers, can be highly influential in forming the future church attendance practices of their children.

In Switzerland, the Fertility and Family Survey was commissioned by the Federal Statistical Office (Switzerland) to enable Switzerland to take part in this international project launched by the UNECE Population Activities Unit. The survey was conducted between October 1994 and May 1995, with the results being published in 2000 by the Council of Europe.  The results are representative of Switzerland's permanent resident population aged 20–49 and presented in the table below.

Practice of religion according to practice of parents (%)

A non-practicing mother with a regular father will see a minimum of two-thirds of her children ending up at church. In contrast, a non-practicing father with a regular mother will see two-thirds of his children not attending church. If his wife is similarly non-practicing that figure rises to 80 percent.

An American study found similar results on the impact of fathers:
When both parents attend Sunday school, 72% of the children attend Sunday school when grown.
When only the father attends Sunday school, 55% of the children attend when grown.
When only the mother attends Sunday school, 15% of the children attend when grown.
When neither parent attends Sunday school, only 6% of the children attend when grown.

Invitations 

Research on individuals residing in the United States and Canada concluded that "Ninety-six percent of the unchurched are at least somewhat likely to attend church if they are invited." In July 2018, LifeWay Research found that "Nearly two-thirds of Protestant churchgoers say they’ve invited at least one person to visit their church in the past six months".

Trends 

Church attendance in advanced industrial societies is in gradual general decline with people shifting from weekly to monthly or holiday attendance. Sociologists have attributed this trend to a number of reasons, starting from a simple boredom during services and lack of motivation, to generational incompatibility of belief systems and social changes attributed to modernity. Research across 65 different nations showed that out of 20 advanced industrial countries, 16 demonstrated a declining rate of monthly church attendance.

An article published in the Christianity Today Magazine in 2007 suggested that in America, church attendance since the 1990s had remained stable. 

The percent of Americans who regularly attend religious services has fluctuated over time, but presently is at a low point. In Gallup Poll surveys, the yearly aggregate of those who answer "yes" to the question "Did you, yourself, happen to attend church or synagogue in the last seven days, or not?" was 36% in 2014, 2015, and 2016. This is a very long-running Gallup question: "In 1939, when Gallup first asked this question, 41% said 'yes.' That percentage dropped to 37% in 1940 and rose to 39% in 1950. It continued to climb, reaching as high as 49% at multiple points in the 1950s. Attendance then settled down to figures around 40% for decades, before dropping to 36%" beginning in 2014.

The decline in church attendance is more pronounced in developed European countries, where it is suggested that the secular culture overrides interest in religion. In Poland, church attendance has declined from more than 50% in 1979 to 40% in 2012.

Disparity between self reported and actual attendance 
In the early 1990s, American sociologists Kirk Hadaway, Penny Marler, and Mark Chaves found that weekly attendance at Protestant and Catholic churches in one rural county in Ohio was only about 20%, whereas self-reported church attendance was 36%. The following studies confirmed a long-suspected gap between actual and self-reporting church attendance. The researchers have been wary of accusing over-reporters of dishonesty, as they found in the study that those who over-report do so mainly to maintain perceptions of themselves as "churched" Americans, not because they are afraid to reveal to the interviewer that they are "bad Christians." The findings point to a bigger issue as many people in the world may be over-reporting church attendance because of their self-perception and identity as churchgoing people, indicating a certain psychological aspect to the over-reporting of church attendance. Although surveys of church attendance are aimed to study religious behavior, many respondents view them as questions about their identity. This is especially true among Americans who consider themselves "regular churchgoers."

See also 

 Christian Church
 Christian denomination
 Church membership
 Church service
 Service of worship
 Jumu'ah (Muslim weekly congregation for prayer)
 Shabbat (Jewish weekly day of rest)

References

Notes

Citations

Christianity and society
Sociology of religion
Christian worship and liturgy